T&D may refer to:
 T&D Holdings, a Japanese insurance company
 T+D, a magazine of the American Society for Training & Development
 T&D Industries Ltd, a defunct UK firm - see Re T&D Industries plc
 Tease and Denial (Erotic sexual denial), a sexual practice also known as orgasm denial
 The Times and Democrat, a newspaper in Orangeburg, South Carolina, US
 Tralee and Dingle Light Railway, former railway in Ireland
 Transmission and Distribution - see Electric power transmission
 Transposition and docking, formally Transposition, docking, and extraction, a maneuver performed in space flight
 Training and development, a function of human resource management